Terry C. Anderson (born January 10, 1955) is a former American football wide receiver in the National Football League for the Miami Dolphins, the Washington Redskins, and the San Francisco 49ers.  He played college football at Bethune-Cookman University and was drafted in the twelfth round of the 1977 NFL Draft.

Anderson is now a dean of students and football coach at Rangeview High School in Aurora, Colorado.

References

Bethune–Cookman University alumni
People from Eastover, South Carolina
American football wide receivers
Bethune–Cookman Wildcats football players
Miami Dolphins players
Washington Redskins players
San Francisco 49ers players
1955 births
Living people